NADH dehydrogenase [ubiquinone] iron-sulfur protein 2, mitochondrial (NDUFS2) also known as NADH-ubiquinone oxidoreductase 49 kDa subunit is an enzyme that in humans is encoded by the NDUFS2 gene. The protein encoded by this gene is a core subunit of the mitochondrial membrane respiratory chain NADH dehydrogenase (complex I). Mutations in this gene are associated with mitochondrial complex I deficiency.

Structure 
NDUFS2 is located on the q arm of chromosome 1 in position 23.3 and has 15 exons. The NDUFS2 gene produces a 52.5 kDa protein composed of 463 amino acids. NDUFS2, the protein encoded by this gene, is a member of the complex I 49 kDa subunit family. It is a peripheral membrane protein on the matrix side of the inner mitochondrial membrane. It contains a cofactor binding site for a [4Fe-4S] cluster, a transit peptide, 5 turns, 11 beta strands, and 18 alpha helixes. Alternatively spliced transcript variants encoding different isoforms have been found for this gene.

Function 

Mitochondrial complex I is the first multimeric complex of the respiratory chain that catalyzes the NADH oxidation with concomitant ubiquinone reduction and proton ejection out of the mitochondria. Mammalian mitochondrial complex I is an assembly of at least 43 different subunits. Seven of the subunits are encoded by the mitochondrial genome; the remainder are the products of nuclear genes. The iron-sulfur protein (IP) fraction of complex I is made up of 7 subunits, including NDUFS2. Dimethylation at Arg-118 by NDUFAF7 takes place after NDUFS2 assembles into the complex I, leading to the stabilization of the early intermediate complex.

Clinical significance 

Mutations in the NDUFS2 gene are associated with Mitochondrial Complex I Deficiency, which is autosomal recessive. This deficiency is the most common enzymatic defect of the oxidative phosphorylation disorders. Mitochondrial complex I deficiency shows extreme genetic heterogeneity and can be caused by mutation in nuclear-encoded genes or in mitochondrial-encoded genes. There are no obvious genotype–phenotype correlations, and inference of the underlying basis from the clinical or biochemical presentation is difficult, if not impossible. However, the majority of cases are caused by mutations in nuclear-encoded genes. It causes a wide range of clinical disorders, ranging from lethal neonatal disease to adult-onset neurodegenerative disorders. Phenotypes include macrocephaly with progressive leukodystrophy, nonspecific encephalopathy, hypertrophic cardiomyopathy, myopathy, liver disease, Leigh syndrome, Leber hereditary optic neuropathy, and some forms of Parkinson disease.

Interactions 
NDUFS2 has been shown to have 121 binary protein-protein interactions including 112 co-complex interactions. NDUFS2 appears to interact with NDUFS3, MKLN1, EGR2, HMOX2, CENPU, and TNFRSF14.

See also 

 NDUFS1

References

Further reading 

 
 
 
 
 
 
 
 
 
 
 
 

Human proteins
EC 1.6.5
EC 1.6.99